The Swinomish Indian Tribal Community, also known as the Swinomish Tribe, is a federally recognized Tribe located on Puget Sound in Washington. They are an Indigenous people of the Pacific Northwest that includes the Central and Coast Salish peoples who lived in the Samish and Skagit River valleys, nearby coasts, and islands. The Tribe's population includes Swinomish, Lower Skagit, Upper Skagit, Kikiallus,  and Samish peoples.

Reservation

The Swinomish Reservation is located on Puget Sound, on the southeastern side of Fidalgo Island in Skagit County, Washington. It was established in 1855 by the Treaty of Point Elliot. The reservation is 15 square miles in area, including 7,450 acres of upland and 2,900 acres of tidelands. According to the 2000 census, the resident population of 2,664 persons, with 23 percent being of full Native American ancestry.

Prominent sites on the Swinomish Reservation include:

 Swadabs Park, on Swinomish Channel: The park features three pavilions resembling woven cedar hats, interpretive panels, and a native plant garden. The park was developed for the 2011 Canoe Journey/Paddle to Swinomish. Canoe races also take place here in the channel.
 Kukutali Preserve: the first Tribal State Park in the history of the United States to be co-owned and jointly managed by a federally recognized Native Nation and a state government. The preserve is entirely on the Swinomish Reservation and encompasses 83 acres spanning three islands, with more than two miles of natural shoreline, and is adjacent to 38 acres of Swinomish-owned tidelands.

Government
The Tribe's headquarters is in Swinomish Village. The Tribe drafted its constitution and by-laws in 1936, following the Indian Reorganization Act, which encouraged Tribes to re-establish self-government.

Swinomish is governed by a democratically elected, 11-member Senate; members serve staggered five-year-terms. Senate officers in 2015 are:

 Chairman: Brian Cladoosby
 Vice chairman: Brian Porter
 Treasurer: Barbara James
 Secretary: Sophie Bailey.

Cladoosby has served as chairman since 1997, succeeding Robert W. Joe, who was elected chairman in 1978. In October 2015, Cladoosby was elected to a second term as president of the National Congress of American Indians, the fourth Native American leader from Washington state to serve in that position.

Craig Bill, Swinomish, is director of the Governor's Office of Indian Affairs. Janie Beasley, Swinomish, is a member of the La Conner School Board.

The Swinomish Medical Center provides healthcare services for local Native Americans. Opened in 2000, the clinic building also houses a fitness center and diabetes program.

Culture
English is commonly spoken by Tribal members. Some elders speak Swinomish (also known as Skagit), a Lushootseed language that is part of the Central Salish language family. Some also spoke Samish, another Central Salish language.

The Swinomish traditionally cultivated clam gardens and are reviving the practice to build climate resilience. Global warming and its effects, such as ocean acidification, affect the development of shells of marine animals vital to Swinomish food supply. As such, the Swinomish consider Indigenous health indicators a metric of climate change.

Economic development
The Swinomish Tribe owns and operates the Swinomish Casino & Lodge, overlooking Padilla Bay; Swinomish Golf Links, nearby on Highway 20; Swinomish RV Park, on Swinomish Channel; Swinomish Fish Co., which processes and cans salmon marketed worldwide under the "Native Catch" label; and two Chevron stations and convenient stores.

See also

Notes

References
 Pritzker, Barry M. A Native American Encyclopedia: History, Culture, and Peoples. Oxford: Oxford University Press, 2000. .

External links
 Swinomish Indian Tribal Community, official website

Coast Salish governments
Native American tribes in Washington (state)
Geography of Skagit County, Washington
Federally recognized tribes in the United States
Indigenous peoples of the Pacific Northwest Coast